The 1829 Maine gubernatorial election took place on September 14, 1829. Incumbent Democratic-Republican Governor Enoch Lincoln did not run for re-election. National Republican candidate Jonathan G. Hunton defeated Democratic candidate Samuel E. Smith.

Lincoln died in Augusta, Maine, on October 8, 1829, after the election of his successor Jonathan G. Hunton before Lincoln's term expired. Two Presidents of the Maine Senate, Nathan Cutler and Joshua Hall, had to serve as lame-duck successors between the two men.

Results

References

Gubernatorial
1829
Maine
September 1829 events